Merops may refer to:
 Merops (mythology), the name of several figures from Greek mythology
 Merops (genus), a genus of bee-eaters.
 MEROPS, an on-line database for peptidases